Marintia Escobedo Santibáñez is a Mexican television personality and actress.

Telenovelas
Vivan Los Niños (2002) Amelia
Mi Camino Es Amarte (2022) Lic. Roberta

Unitarios

La Rosa De Guadalupe (2023)...Leonor
Como dice el dicho (2020)...Sandra 
Como dice el dicho (2019)...Alberta
Como dice el dicho (2018)...Anisha
Como dice el dicho (2017)...Marisa

Realities Show

Big Brother Vip (2003) Primera Expulsada

Cine
Elisa antes del fin del mundo

Conducción
Programa Hoy (2018) 
El terreno de Eva (2003) 
Projection 2000
24 horas 
Noticias Eco
En Vivo

External links

1960 births
Mexican film actresses
Mexican stage actresses
Mexican television actresses
Living people

ar:Marintia Escobedo
es:Marintia Escobedo